Original Cast Album: Company is a 1970 documentary film by D. A. Pennebaker, observing the marathon recording session to create the original cast album for the Stephen Sondheim musical Company.

Background
Pennebaker initially intended the project as a pilot for a television series dedicated to the making-of different cast recordings. His small film crew joined the musical's cast at the Columbia Records 30th Street recording studio in early May 1970, shortly after Company opened on Broadway.

Release
As Company continued its successful run on Broadway, the film was screened at the New York Film Festival in September 1970, unanimously praised by a crowd that filled the auditorium to capacity. The documentary was scheduled to be broadcast in New York on October 25, 1970. However, a week after the original screening, all the original producers for the proposed series were hired by Hollywood for a production at MGM. With nobody left in New York to spearhead the making-of series, the idea was scrapped, leaving only the pilot film behind.

Synopsis
Filled with behind the scenes footage of the marathon recording process at the Columbia Records studio at East 30th Street and Third Avenue on the first Sunday in May, the film captures both the musical direction and insight of composer Sondheim.  Several of Company songs appear in the film, including "Another Hundred People", "Getting Married Today", and "Being Alive"—all recorded with a live orchestra, done in multiple takes, over the course of a lengthy studio session.

Eventually, several hours past midnight, only "The Ladies Who Lunch" remains to be recorded. Elaine Stritch, Sondheim, and the orchestra are all clearly suffering the effects of the prolonged recording session.  Stritch struggles repeatedly to record a satisfactory version of the song, even going so far as to slightly drop the key for a few takes. Her voice continues to degrade as her energy ebbs away. There is increasing tension between the struggling Stritch, producer Thomas Z. Shepard, and Sondheim.

Shortly before dawn, the decision is made to wrap. A final orchestral take is recorded, with a plan to have Stritch return to the studio to record her vocal separately. The film cuts to a revitalized Stritch, in full hair and makeup (in preparation for a Wednesday matinee performance of the show), triumphantly singing "The Ladies Who Lunch".

Cast and songs
 Dean Jones – Robert: "Being Alive", "Barcelona"
 Elaine Stritch – Joanne: "Little Things You Do Together", "Ladies Who Lunch"
 Barbara Barrie – Sarah
 George Coe – David
 John Cunningham – Peter
 Teri Ralston – Jenny
 Charles Kimbrough – Harry
 Donna McKechnie – Kathy: "You Could Drive a Person Crazy"
 Charles Braswell – Larry
 Susan Browning – April: "You Could Drive a Person Crazy", "Barcelona"
 Steve Elmore – Paul
 Beth Howland – Amy: "Getting Married Today"
 Pamela Myers – Marta: "You Could Drive a Person Crazy", "Another Hundred People"
 Merle Louise – Susan
with
 Stephen Sondheim – songwriter
 Thomas Z. Shepard – record producer
 Harold Hastings – musical director
 George Furth – playwright
 Harold Prince – director

Influence and legacy
The film earned a brief rave in The New York Times when slated for a theatrical screening at the IFC Center in October 2014.

The film serves as the basis for the parody Original Cast Album: Co-Op, a mockumentary depicting the cast album recording session for a 1970s musical about a New York City apartment cooperative. The New York Times television critic Mike Hale interviewed Pennebaker and Sondheim about the comedy spoof when it first aired in February 2019. A conversation about the parody episode, recorded in 2020, was included in the Criterion release the following year.

Home media
The Criterion Channel began streaming the documentary, to wide acclaim, on June 15, 2020, along with a 2001 commentary recorded by Pennebaker, Harold Prince, and Elaine Stritch, offering their insights on both the original Broadway production, as well as the documentary itself. Prince shares his account of Dean Jones' experience and the challenges of playing the lead. Prince observes that no one was better in the very difficult part than Jones.

The Criterion Collection released a special DVD and Blu-ray edition of the documentary on August 17, 2021. A restored 4K transfer of the film, the release features newly-produced and archival special features including a new commentary with Sondheim, along with the parody Original Cast Album: Co-Op.

References

External links
 

Cast recordings
1970 soundtrack albums